Shuangshan is a station on Line 3 of the Qingdao Metro. It opened on 16 December 2015.

References

Qingdao Metro stations
Railway stations in China opened in 2015